Priscula is a genus of South American cellar spiders that was first described by Eugène Louis Simon in 1893.

Species
 it contains 20 species, found only in South America:
Priscula acarite (Huber, 2020) – Venezuela
Priscula andinensis González-Sponga, 1999 – Venezuela
Priscula annulipes (Keyserling, 1877) – Colombia
Priscula binghamae (Chamberlin, 1916) – Peru, Bolivia, Argentina
Priscula bolivari (Huber, 2020) – Venezuela
Priscula chejapi González-Sponga, 1999 – Venezuela
Priscula gularis Simon, 1893 (type) – Ecuador
Priscula huila Huber, 2000 – Colombia
Priscula lagunosa González-Sponga, 1999 – Venezuela
Priscula limonensis González-Sponga, 1999 – Venezuela
Priscula paeza Huber, 2000 – Colombia
Priscula paila (Huber, 2020) – Venezuela
Priscula pallisteri Huber, 2000 – Peru
Priscula piapoco Huber, 2000 – Venezuela
Priscula piedraensis González-Sponga, 1999 – Venezuela
Priscula salmeronica González-Sponga, 1999 – Venezuela
Priscula taruma Huber, 2000 – Guyana
Priscula tunebo Huber, 2000 – Venezuela
Priscula ulai González-Sponga, 1999 – Venezuela
Priscula venezuelana Simon, 1893 – Venezuela

See also
 List of Pholcidae species

References

Araneomorphae genera
Pholcidae
Spiders of South America